Konstantinos "Kostas" Batsinilas (born 12 February 1963) is a Greek former footballer who played as a midfielder and made 22 appearances for the Greece national team.

Career
Batsinilas made his international debut for Greece on 14 December 1983 in a UEFA Euro 1984 qualifying match against Luxembourg, which finished as a 1–0 win. He went on to make 22 appearances, scoring 2 goals, before making his last appearance on 21 May 1988 in a 1988 Sir Stanley Matthews Cup match against Canada, which finished as a 3–0 win.

Career statistics

International

International goals

References

External links
 
 
 

1963 births
Living people
Greece international footballers
Association football midfielders
Ethnikos Piraeus F.C. players
Panathinaikos F.C. players
OFI Crete F.C. players
Apollon Smyrnis F.C. players
Korinthos F.C. players
Super League Greece players
Footballers from Piraeus
Greek footballers